Guillermo Durán and Roberto Quiroz were the defending champions but only Quiroz chose to defend his title, partnering Yannick Hanfmann. Quiroz lost in the first round to Luis David Martínez and Felipe Meligeni Alves.

Ariel Behar and Gonzalo Escobar won the title after defeating Pedro Sakamoto and Thiago Seyboth Wild 7–6(7–4), 7–6(7–5) in the final.

Seeds

Draw

References

External links
 Main draw

Challenger Ciudad de Guayaquil - Doubles
2019 Doubles